Tirchhi Topiwale is a 1998 Bollywood musical comedy-drama film directed by Nadeem Khan and produced by Babu Latiwala. It stars Chunkey Pandey and Monica Bedi in pivotal roles.

Plot 
Two businessmen promise that they will arrange a marriage between their children each other. But the children are already in love with someone else.

Cast
 Chunky Pandey as Anand
 Inder Kumar as Amit Mehra
 Monica Bedi as Sanam Oberoi
 Rituparna Sengupta as Sikha Oberoi(Sanam's elder sister)
 Kader Khan as Mr. Oberoi (Sanam's dad)
 Reema Lagoo as Sumitra Oberoi
 Satish Shah as Gokul Pai
 Alok Nath as Alok Lucknowi
 Himani Shivpuri as Mrs. Alok Lucknowi
 Johnny Lever as Kadak K. Pillay
 Anupam Kher as Mr. Mehra
 Arjun Firoz Khan
 Shehzad Khan
 Shail Chaturvedi
 Jackie Shroff as Jackie Shroff (Himself)

Soundtrack

References

External links

1990s Hindi-language films
1998 films
Films scored by Anand Raj Anand
Indian comedy-drama films